Maki Meguro (目黒真希 Meguro Maki, born July 27, 1972, in Miyagi Prefecture) is a Japanese actress. She starred in the 2009 Yuya Ishii film . She also played a supporting role in the 2016 film .

References

External links
Profile at Breath, Inc. (Official site; in Japanese) 

Japanese actresses
1972 births
Living people
Actors from Miyagi Prefecture